No. 127 Wing RCAF was a formation of the Royal Canadian Air Force during the Second World War. It comprised No. 403 Squadron RCAF, No. 416 Squadron RCAF and No. 443 Squadron RCAF.

History

127 Wing, or the 'Kenley Wing', based at RAF Kenley, was led by Wing Commander 'Johnnie' Johnson from Spring to September 1943, and he returned to command it during the Normandy Campaign.

On 5 June 1944 the wing was based at RAF Tangmere and consisted of 403, 416, and 421 Squadron's

See also
 List of wings of the Royal Air Force

References

Citations

Bibliography

Units and formations of the Royal Canadian Air Force
RCAF 127